Sir Robert Talbot, 2nd Baronet (1608 – after 1670) of Carton was an Irish landowner, soldier, and politician. He sat for Wicklow County in the Irish parliament 1634–1635.

Birth and origins 
Robert was born in 1608, the eldest son of William Talbot and his wife Alison Netterville. His father was the 1st Baronet Talbot of Carton, County Kildare. His father's family was Old English.

His mother was a daughter of John Netterville. 

He was one of 16 siblings, who are listed in his father's article. Among his younger brothers were Peter Talbot, who became the Catholic Archbishop of Dublin, and the soldier and courtier Richard Talbot, whose career eventually eclipsed Robert's as Richard rose to become Lord Lieutenant of Ireland under James II and commanded the Royal Irish Army during the Williamite War.

Like most other Old English families, the Talbots and Nettervilles remained Roman Catholics after the Reformation.

Marriage and children 

Talbot married Grace Calvert, the daughter of George Calvert, 1st Baron Baltimore, a leading English Catholic and founder of the Maryland Colony. Grace was one of thirteen children by his wife Anne Mynne or Mayne, daughter of George Mynne and Elizabeth Wroth. 

 
Robert and Grace had a daughters:
 Frances (died 1718) married her cousin Richard Talbot of Malahide

They lived at Castlesallagh, County Wicklow.

Baronet 
He succeeded his father as 2nd baronet Talbot of Carton on 16 March 1634.

MP 
On 10 June 1634 Talbot was elected MP for Wicklow County in the Parliament 1634–1635. He was expelled from parliament for lacking respect to Thomas Wentworth, Lord Deputy.

Irish Confederate war and Cromwellian conquest 
After the outbreak of the Irish Rebellion of 1641, Talbot joined the Irish Catholic Confederates and was a leading member of the Moderate Faction on the Supreme Council. He served as an officer in the Leinster Army. In July 1651, during the Cromwellian conquest of Ireland he was forced to surrender Athlone to the advancing English Republican forces under Charles Coote. His lands were forfeited at the defeat. Under the Act of Settlement 1662 he recovered most of his lands.

Death and succession 
In or after 1671, he died and was succeeded by his nephew Sir William Talbot, 3rd Baronet, who would be the last of the Carton baronets.

Notes and references

Notes

Citations

Sources 

 
 
  – 1611 to 1625
 
 
  – Does not seem to be available online
 

 

1670 deaths
17th-century Irish people
Baronets in the Baronetage of Ireland
Irish soldiers
Irish people of English descent
Irish Roman Catholic Confederates
Members of the Parliament of Ireland (pre-1801) for County Wicklow constituencies
People from County Kildare
People from County Wicklow
People of the Irish Confederate Wars
Year of birth uncertain
Year of birth unknown
Irish MPs 1634–1635